Olavi Vauhkonen is a Finnish professional ice hockey winger who currently plays for Tappara of the Liiga.

Vauhkonen previously played for Jokerit, SaiPa, Lukko and Vaasan Sport.

References

External links

1989 births
Living people
Jokerit players
Jokipojat players
KeuPa HT players
Kiekko-Vantaa players
Lukko players
SaiPa players
Ice hockey people from Helsinki
Vaasan Sport players
Finnish ice hockey forwards
Tappara players